Gobindram Mitter (also spelt Govindram Mitra, Gobindaram Mitra, Gobinda Ram Mitra, Gobindro Ram Mitro) was one of the earliest Indian officials during the Company rule in India, who earned reputation for his wealth and extravagance.

Early life 
He was born in Chanak village near Barrackpur, now in North 24 Parganas district. When the English bought the three villages of Kalikata, Sutanuti and Gobindapur from the Sabarna Roy Choudhury family in 1698 and established their zemindary (estate) or presidency in Kolkata, they appointed an Indian deputy collector to assist the English collector in the collection of rent. The first Indian deputy collector was Nandaram Sen. After his discharge, the second Indian to step into that position was Gobindram Mitra.

Success

Extravagance 

Mitter earned fabulous amounts of money. He was so powerful that his boss Holwell could not remove him.   

He is credited by some as being the first Bengali to drive a coach. His celebration of the Hindu festivals was marked with lavishness and extravagance. The entire image of goddess Durga was wrapped in gold and silver leaf. Thirty to fifty maunds (one maund is about 37 kg) of rice was offered to the deity, a thousand Brahmins were fed and given gifts. It was he who fired the urge for conspicuous consumption in the society of his time. Mitter had a sprawling house at Kumortuli spread on 50 bighas (around 16 acres) of land. He also had a famous villa, Nandan Bagan, in rural Bengal.

Legend 
Mitter became a legend in his lifetime. He was famous as native deputy and the words "Gobindramer chhari" (Gobndram's stick) was celebrated in a Bengali rhyming proverb: 

Banamali Sarakrer bari
Gobindram Mitrer chhari
Umichander dari
Huzoorimaler kori
 Ke na jane?

Banamali Sarkar’s house
Gobindram Mitter’s stick
Umichand’s beard
Huzoorimal’s money
Who does not know of these?

Banamali Sarkar's grand house was built in Kumortuli during the period 1740 to 1750.

Temple 

Mitter built a nine-turreted or nabaratna temple of goddess Kali on the banks of the Ganges at Kumortuli in 1725 (some say, it was in 1731). Its 165-feet spire was a navigational aid for sailors. They called it the 'pagoda'. The ruins of the temple can be seen near the Siddheswari Kalimandir in Bagbazar.

Descendants 
His son, Roghoo (Raghu) Mitter had a Ganges bathing ghat (stairs) named after him (it was possibly built by him). It later became popular as Baghbazar ghat. Roghoo Mitter's grandson Abhay Charan Mitter was the dewan of the collector of 24 Parganas and is reputed to have given a lakh of rupees to his guru or spiritual preceptor and then came his grandson Dhanada Charan Mitter and then his grandson Jagannath Mitra and then his son Rajarshi Mitra and now his son Romit Mitra. A street in Kumartuli is named after Abhay Charan Mitra. Jorabagan, a Kolkata neighbourhood was so named because the road through it led to the garden houses of Gobindram Mitter and Umichand.

References

See also 
 Legendary personalities in Bengal

People from North 24 Parganas district
Businesspeople from Kolkata
1776 deaths
Year of birth unknown
18th-century Indian businesspeople